MS Seatruck Progress is a ro-ro freight ferry that entered service with Seatruck Ferries in December 2011.

History
She is one of four ships built by Flensburger Schiffbau-Gesellschaft, Germany. Seatruck Progress was the first new build to be completed; the last is expected to be launched in June 2012.

Seatruck Progress was launched on 19 August 2011 and was christened by Karen Donaldson, the Head of Finance at Seatruck. The ship was completed in November 2011 and was delivered to Seatruck in December.

On 20 December 2011, Seatruck Progress made her maiden voyage for Seatruck.

In September 2012, Seatruck Progress went on charter to DFDS before returning to service with Seatruck on the Liverpool - Dublin route.

Description
Seatruck Progress is one of four RoRo 2200 freight ferries, which are the largest ships in the Seatruck fleet. They are the largest ships to operate out of the port of Heysham.

The RoRo 2200 vessels have a freight capacity of 2,166 lane metres over four decks, carrying 151 trailers. Propulsion is provided by two MAN engines and twin screws.

Sister Vessels
Seatruck Performance
Seatruck Precision
Seatruck Power

References

 https://web.archive.org/web/20110916215814/http://www.motorship.com/news101/seatruck-takes-first-new-ferry-from-fsg
 Article Title
 http://img196.imageshack.us/img196/2339/dsc04009ul.jpg
 http://exchange.dnv.com/exchange/main.aspx?extool=vessel&subview=machinerysummary&vesselid=29359

External links

Ships of Seatruck Ferries
Ferries of the United Kingdom
2011 ships
Ships built in Flensburg
Merchant ships of the Isle of Man